Monju Nuclear Power Plant was a Japanese nuclear reactor, located in Fukui Prefecture.

Monju may also refer to:

 Monju (train), a train service in Japan
 Monju, the Japanese name for the bodhisattva Manjusri